Évreux is a commune in and the capital of the department of Eure, in the French region of Normandy.

Geography
The city is on the Iton river.

Climate

History

In late Antiquity, the town, attested in the fourth century CE, was named Mediolanum Aulercorum, "the central town of the Aulerci", the Gallic tribe then inhabiting the area. Mediolanum was a small regional centre of the Roman province of Gallia Lugdunensis. Julius Caesar wintered eight legions in this area after his third campaigning season in the battle for Gaul (56-55 BC): Legiones VII, VIII, IX, X, XI, XII, XIII and XIV.

The present-day name of Évreux originates from the Gallic tribe of Eburovices, literally Those who overcome by the yew?, from the Gaulish root eburos.

Counts of Évreux

The first known members of the family of the counts of Évreux were descended from an illegitimate son of Richard I, duke of Normandy; these counts became extinct in the male line with the death of Count William in 1118. The county passed in right of Agnes, William's sister, wife of Simon de Montfort-l'Amaury (died 1087) to the house of the lords of Montfort-l'Amaury. Amaury VI de Montfort-Évreux ceded the title in 1200 to King Philip Augustus, whose successor Philip the Fair presented it in 1307 to his brother Louis d'Évreux, for whose benefit Philip the Long raised the county of Évreux into a peerage of France in 1317.

Philip d'Évreux, son of Louis, became king of Navarre by his marriage to Joan II of Navarre, daughter of Louis the Headstrong, and their son Charles the Bad and their grandson Charles the Noble were also kings of Navarre. The latter ceded his counties of Évreux, Champagne and Brie to King Charles VI of France in 1404.

In 1427 the county of Évreux was bestowed by King Charles VII on Sir John Stewart of Darnley (c. 1365–1429), the commander of his Scottish bodyguard, who in 1423 had received the seigniory of Aubigny, and in February 1427/8 he was granted the right to quarter the royal arms of France for his victories over the English.
On Stuart's death before Orléans, during an attack on an English convoy, the county reverted to the crown. It was again temporarily alienated (1569–1584) as an appanage for Duke François of Anjou, and in 1651 was finally given to Frédéric Maurice de La Tour d'Auvergne, duc de Bouillon, in exchange for the Principality of Sedan.

The most famous holder of the title is Louis Henri de La Tour d'Auvergne, son of Marie Anne Mancini.

Évreux was heavily damaged during the Second World War, and most of its centre was rebuilt. The nearby Évreux-Fauville Air Base was used by the United States Air Force until 1967, and since then by the French Air Force.

Ecclesiastical history

Évreux Cathedral has been the seat of the bishops of Évreux since its traditional founder, Saint Taurin of Évreux, most probably working between 375 and 425; Bishop Maurusius was present at the Council of Orléans in 511. The earliest parts of the present building, which is mostly Gothic, date from the eleventh century. The west façade and its two towers are mostly from the late Renaissance; the octagonal central tower dates from the late fifteenth century. Of especial note are the Lady chapel and its stained glass, the rose windows in the transepts and the carved wooden screens of the side chapels.

The church of the former abbey of St-Taurin is in part Romanesque. It has a choir of the 14th century and other portions of later date, and contains the thirteenth-century shrine of Saint Taurin.

The episcopal palace, a building of the fifteenth century, adjoins the south side of the cathedral.
The belfry facing the hôtel de ville also dates from the fifteenth century.

Centre of Jewish learning
In the Middle Ages, Évreux was one of the centres of Jewish learning, and its scholars are quoted in the medieval notes to the Talmud called the Tosafot.

The following rabbis are known to have lived at Évreux: Samuel ben Shneor, praised by his student Isaac of Corbeil as the "Prince of Évreux", one of the most celebrated tosafists; Moses of Évreux, brother of Samuel, author of the Tosafot of Évreux; Isaac of Évreux; Judah ben Shneor, or Judah the Elder, author of liturgical poems; Meïr ben Shneor; Samuel ben Judah; Nathan ben Jacob, father of Jacob ben Nathan, who in 1357 copied the five Megillot with the Targum for Moses ben Samuel.

Population

Its inhabitants are called Ébroïciens.

Sights

Évreux is situated in the pleasant valley of the Iton, arms of which traverse the town; on the south, the ground slopes up toward the public gardens and the railway station. It is the seat of a bishop, and its cathedral is one of the largest and finest in France.

The first cathedral was built in 1076, but destroyed in 1119 when the town was burned at the orders of Henry I of France to put down the Norman insurrection. He rebuilt the cathedral as an act of atonement to the Pope. Between 1194 and 1198, the conflict between Philippe Auguste and Richard the Lion-hearted damaged the new cathedral. The architecture of the present edifice shows this history, with its blend of Romanesque and Gothic styles. As did many towns in the regions of Nord and Normandy, Évreux and its cathedral suffered greatly from Second World War.

Évreux Cathedral
Hôtel de ville 
Église Saint-Taurin

Administration
 The communauté d'agglomération Évreux Portes de Normandie has 62 communes.

Cantons
Since 2015, Évreux is part of three cantons:
The canton of Évreux-1 includes a part of Évreux and the communes of: Arnières-sur-Iton and Saint-Sébastien-de-Morsent (pop: 24,125 in 2019);
The canton of Évreux-2 includes a part of Évreux and the communes of: Aviron, Le Boulay-Morin, La Chapelle-du-Bois-des-Faulx, Dardez, Émalleville, Gravigny, Irreville, Normanville, Reuilly, Saint-Germain-des-Angles and Saint-Vigor (pop: 28,128);
The canton of Évreux-3 includes a part of Évreux and the communes of: Angerville-la-Campagne, Les Baux-Sainte-Croix, Boncourt, Cierrey, Fauville, Gauciel, Guichainville, Huest, Miserey, Le Plessis-Grohan, Saint-Luc, Sassey, La Trinité, Le Val-David and Le Vieil-Évreux (pop: 22,912);

Mayors
Évreux has historically maintained socialist politics, with Roland Plaisance of the French Communist Party serving as mayor for over two decades (1977–2001). Plaisance was followed by Jean-Louis Debré, in some part due to the latter's friendship with Jacques Chirac. In 2014, Guy Lefrand (UMP, centre-right) a former member of the National Assembly of France, was elected mayor, with a mandate lasting six years.

Transport
The train station Gare d'Évreux-Normandie is on the railway line from Gare Saint-Lazare to Cherbourg, it is served by regular Intercity and regional rail services to both Paris and Normandy.
There used to be two stations in Évreux, only one of which remains open to this day. The second station (Évreux-Nord) served the line from Évreux to Rouen.

Personalities
Moses of Évreux was a French tosafist, and author of a siddur, who flourished at Évreux in the first half of the thirteenth century
Esteban Ocon, Formula 1 racing driver
Abdoullakh Abouyedovich Anzorov, terrorist
Bintou Dieme, basketball player
Joseph Gomis, basketball player
Michael Victor Evreux, Entrepreneur, and US businessman with ties to construction and precious metal markets. Born June 1961 in the United States.
Jean-Louis Hue (born 1949), writer, winner of the 1982 edition of the Prix Fénéon
Denis Lhuillier, footballer
Joseph Mendes, footballer
Bernard Mendy, footballer
Élodie Mendy, basketball player
Léon Walras, economist
Edmond Doutté, sociologist, orientalist and Islamologist
Mathieu Bodmer, footballer
Jean-Luc Hees, president of the radio group Radio France
Vincent Delerm, a singer of the Nouvelle scène trend
Didier Courrèges, an equestrian of the prestigious cadre noir, Olympic winner with the French team in Athens
Olivier Patience, tennis player
Ouleymata Sarr, footballer
Dayot Upamencano, footballer
Gérard Serée, artist
Jean-Yves Raimbaud, co-creator of Space Goofs with Philippe Traversat, creator of Oggy and the Cockroaches

Twin towns – sister cities

Évreux is twinned with:
 Djougou, Benin
 Kashira, Russia
 Rugby, England, United Kingdom
 Rüsselsheim, Germany

See also
Communes of the Eure department
 Norman language

References

External links

 City council website (in French)
 Photos of the Cathedral of Evreux
 Tourism office of Evreux

 
Communes of Eure
Prefectures in France
Eburovices
Gallia Lugdunensis